The Ulgi Lighthouse is a lighthouse in Ulsan, South Korea.

History
The lighthouse commenced operations  in 1906.

References

1906 establishments in Korea
Lighthouses in South Korea
Lighthouses completed in 1906
Buildings and structures in Ulsan